Typist Artist Pirate King is an upcoming film written and directed by Carol Morley and starring Kelly MacDonald and Monica Dolan about the life and art of artist, Audrey Amiss. The film had it's world premiere at the Tallinn Black Nights Film Festival in November 2022 and a UK premiere at the Glasgow Film Festival on the 8 March 2023 at Glasgow Film Theatre.

Synopsis
The film is a fictionalised portrait of the late “avant-garde and misunderstood” artist Audrey Amiss. Audrey Amiss was an artist who studied at the Royal Academy of Arts, but was unable to complete her training after being hospitalised due to mental illness. Audrey Amiss died in 2013, leaving behind a vast collection of artworks and writings which were discovered after her death, and subsequently donated to Wellcome Collection.

The film centres on a fictionalised road trip with Audrey Amiss, played by Monica Dolan, and her psychiatric nurse, played by Kelly MacDonald, in which they travel north and reconnect with key individuals and moments from Amiss' past.

The film is based on extensive archival research into Audrey Amiss' archive at Wellcome Collection, undertaken while Carol Morley was a recipient of a Wellcome Screenwriting Fellowship. The film uses imagery and artworks from the archive collection, creating a fictionalised narrative of a real life individual, drawn from archival sources.

Cast
 Monica Dolan as Audrey Amiss
 Kelly Macdonald as Sandra 
 Gina McKee as Dorothy 
 Christine Bottomley as Joan
 Kieran Bew as Gabe Patier

Production
Carol Morley was awarded a Wellcome Screenwriting Fellowship in 2015, where she was introduced to the Audrey Amiss archive by archivists at Wellcome Collection. The Audrey Amiss archive had recently been acquired by Wellcome Collection in 2014, donated by Audrey's niece and nephew a year after Audrey Amiss' death in 2013. Morley undertook extensive research at Wellcome Collection using Audrey Amiss' archive, with the aim of developing a film about Audrey Amiss.

The Audrey Amiss archive comprises hundreds of sketchbooks, scrapbooks, log books, photo albums, account books, record books and paintings. Carol Morley made use of the collection while it was uncatalogued; with cataloguing beginning in 2018 to ensure that the collection could be made more widely available for public use. The collection has now been fully catalogued; from Spring 2023, the collection will be freely available to consult for research in the library at Wellcome Collection. During the research process, Carol Morley also met with members of Audrey Amiss' family and others who knew her in life, as well as speaking with archivists, conservators and other Wellcome Collection staff. Carol wrote about her experiences researching Audrey Amiss for a 2016 piece in The Observer.

The title of the film "Typist Artist Pirate King" is taken from Audrey Amiss' passport, where Audrey wrote her occupation as 'typist artist pirate king'. The passport is held in Audrey Amiss' archive at Wellcome Collection's library.

Carol Morley received funding from the British Film Institute to write and produce the film. In November 2021 MacDonald, Dolan and McKee were announced as onboard the project, with Jane Campion acting as executive producers and Metro International handling sales. Also involved were director of photography Agnès Godard and production designer Janey Levick. Additional funding also came from BCP Asset Management, MBK Productions, LipSync and Genesis Entertainment, Wellcome Trust and BBC Films.
Producers for the feature were Ameenah Ayub Allen and Cairo Cannon. Filming started in November 2021 in Yorkshire. The film entered post production in 2022.

Release
The film had its world premiere at the Tallinn Black Nights Film Festival in November 2022. The film will have its UK premiere at the 2023 Glasgow Film Festival.

Reception
Peter Bradshaw in The Guardian described a “warm and sympathetic film” and that the “casting works with the writing and the black comic and tragicomic nature of their ordeal is often hilarious.”

References

External links

 
2020s English-language films
2020s British films
Films about artists
Films shot in Yorkshire